Cannon Ball  is a census-designated place (CDP) on the Standing Rock Indian Reservation and in Sioux County, North Dakota, United States. It is located in the northeastern part of Sioux County, having developed at the confluence of the Cannonball River and Lake Oahe of the Missouri River. The population was 875 at the 2010 census.

Geography

Demographics

At the 2000 census, there were 864 people, 197 households and 171 families residing in the Cannon Ball Census Designated Place ("CDP"). At the 2010 census, the racial make-up was 92.9% Native American, 4.8% White, 0.1% from other races and 2.2% from two or more races. Persons of Hispanic or Latino origin comprised 1.4% of the total population.

There were 197 households, of which 56.9% had children under the age of 18 living with them, 38.6% were married couples living together, 35.0% had a female householder with no husband present, and 12.7% were non-families. 11.2% of all households were made up of individuals, and 2.0% had someone living alone who was 65 years of age or older. The average household size was 4.35 and the average family size was 4.56.

46.4% of the population were under the age of 18, 11.2% from 18 to 24, 23.5% from 25 to 44, 15.3% from 45 to 64 and 3.6% were 65 years of age or older. The median age was 20 years. For every 100 females, there were 92.4 males. For every 100 females age 18 and over, there were 86.7 males.

The median household income was $19,265 and the median family income was $18,583. Males had a median income of $21,875 and females $17,250. The per capita income was $5,717. About 49.7% of families and 50.9% of the population were below the poverty line, including 58.3% of those under age 18 and 8.6% of those age 65 or over.

Education
Most of Cannon Ball is in the Solen Public School District 3, while a portion is in the Fort Yates School District. Fort Yates is combined with the Standing Rock Community Grant School.

References

Census-designated places in Sioux County, North Dakota
Census-designated places in North Dakota
North Dakota populated places on the Missouri River